William Fiddian Moulton (14 March 1835 – 5 February 1898) was an English Methodist minister, biblical scholar and educator.

Biography
William's father, James Moulton, was a Wesleyan Methodist minister and he had at least three other brothers, and probably two sisters.  Like his father and grandfather, William became a Weslyan minister and in 1875 the first headmaster of The Leys School, Cambridge. He remained headmaster for the rest of his life; one of the school's houses is named after him.

He was elected President of the Methodist Conference at Bristol in 1890.

On a stormy afternoon in 1898, he was on his way to visit a sick parishioner when he suffered a heart attack in the grounds of the school.  A gardener found him and bought him back to his house, where he died soon after, aged sixty-two.  He was interred in Histon Road Cemetery, Cambridge, and has a memorial in Wesley's Chapel, London. The Memorial Chapel, The Leys School was built as a memorial to him; the chapel was consecrated on 27 October 1906. 

In his biography, his son James noted that "So genuine was his sense of unworthiness that praise to him became a positive pain.  He would walk out of the room rather than hear a laudatory passage about himself."

Works
He wrote a concordance of the Greek New Testament, and some titles with his son James.  He sat on various inter-denominational committees concerned with translations of the New Testament.

Selected writings
   
 A Treatise on the Grammar of New Testament Greek by G. B. Winer, translated from the German. 
 Concordance to the Greek Testament, with Alfred Shenington Geden , (subsequently revised by his grandson Harold Keeling Moulton)
 The Story of the Manchester Mission
 The Old World and the New Faith, Notes Upon the Historical Narrative Contained in the Acts of the Apostles 

Biography
 William F. Moulton, a memoir  written by his two sons, William Fiddian Moulton Jr. and James Hope Moulton.

See also
 John Fletcher Moulton, brother
 Richard Green Moulton, brother
 James Egan Moulton, brother
 James Hope Moulton, son

References

Sources
 
 John Wesley's School at Kingswood by John Telford

1835 births
1898 deaths
Methodist theologians
English theologians
English Methodist ministers
English biographers
Headmasters of the Leys School
Methodist writers
British biblical scholars
19th-century Methodist ministers
Burials at Wesley's Chapel
Methodist Church of Great Britain people
William Fiddian
Presidents of the Methodist Conference
19th-century Christian biblical scholars
Methodist biblical scholars